A brakeboard is a skateboard fitted with a specialised truck assembly that includes a braking mechanism.

History
The Brakeboard was first invented in 1999 by Ben Newman of Western Australia. From 2001 the first version was manufactured and sold worldwide. In 2010 The Australian Government provided an R&D grant which enabled the development of a new iteration which was released in Melbourne in January 2013.

In August 2013, Brakeboard was accepted on the USA Kickstarter site for new ideas or inventions; one of the small number of Australian inventions to appear. It received support from more than 200 backers.

In September 2014, a new version of the Brakeboard truck set was released featuring a removable pedal, additional colour choices and heavier-duty brake linings. A new wheel manufacturing process now includes moulded slots.

In April 2015, Brakeboard introduced a new model (3.1) with air-cooled stainless steel
rotors. There are also a number of other mechanical improvements.
This new brake mechanism is designed for both street commuting and long downhill runs.
The new 3.1 rotors can be retro-fitted to all earlier model Brakeboard trucks

In August 2015 a carbon-fibre extension to the pedal was introduced to provide 
for those requiring more powerful brake action. In December 2015 a new model of Canadian maple 
decks was released. Completely assembled decks with Brakeboard trucks also include the
carbon-fibre extension pedal.
https://www.facebook.com/brakeboard/videos/1080304251982272/?theater

Features
The cone brakes, contained within the rear axle assembly or truck, can be attached to the rear of any skateboard deck. It is however, intended mainly for the longboard. It is activated by a foot pedal located on the surface of the board. The brake allows the rider to control their speed on a downhill run and bring the board to a safe stop. In April 2015, the cone brake was replaced with an air-cooled disk brake.

The Brakeboard is sold as a box set containing both trucks and pedal mechanism. Existing wheels can be used with a small modification. Alternatively, a set of specially designed wheels is available. Any deck can be used (including drop-through) by drilling one hole for the pedal plunger. Brakeboard also have their own range of decks so the whole brake system, wheels and deck can be supplied completely assembled. Components and wheels are manufactured in China. Decks are manufactured in California. Distribution centres include Shanghai (China), California (USA) and Melbourne (Australia).

A patent has been granted in the USA. Brakeboard’s trade name is registered with Australian and US authorities.

Awards
The original Brakeboard by Ben Newman was Western Australian winner and national finalist in the Yellow Pages Business Ideas Award in 2001 and a sector winner on the Australian Broadcasting Corporation’s The New Inventors program 2006 Newman was also a runner-up to the winner of the inaugural WA Inventor of the Year competition in 2006, though there was some controversy about the eligibility of award applications.

References

External links

Direct Drive Electric Skateboard

Skateboards